The 7th Corps is a field corps of the Turkish Land Forces. Its headquarters is in Yenişehir, Diyarbakır. The 2nd Army affiliated to the Turkish Land Forces. Turkey provinces; It protects Hakkâri, Şırnak, Şanlıurfa and Siirt against foreign threats that may come from abroad.

Units
3rd Special Forces Division (Yüksekova, Hakkari)
Hakkari Mountain and Commando Brigade (5th Commando Brigade) (Hakkari)
34th Motorized Infantry Brigade (Şemdinli, Hakkari)
2nd Airborne Infantry Commando Brigade (Van)
2nd Motorized Infantry Brigade (Lice, Diyarbakır)
3rd Commando Brigade (Siirt)
21st Motorized Infantry Division (Şırnak)
6th Motorized Infantry Brigade (Akçay, Şırnak)
23rd Motorized Infantry Brigade (Silopi, Şırnak)
48th Motorized Infantry Brigade (Gülyazı, Şırnak)
7th Mechanized Infantry Division (Diyarbakır)
16th Mechanized Infantry Brigade (Devegeçidi, Diyarbakır)
20th Armored Brigade (Şanlıurfa)
70th Mechanized Infantry Brigade (Kızıltepe, Mardin)
107th Artillery Regiment (Siverek, Şanlıurfa)

References

Corps of Turkey